Fort Massacre is a 1958 Western directed by Joseph M. Newman, starring Joel McCrea, Forrest Tucker, John Russell and Susan Cabot. A possibly mad cavalry commander leads his troops through dangerous Indian territory.

Plot
An embittered cavalry sergeant must take over his regiment after their commanding officer is killed during an ambush. Vinson is driven by his hatred of Apaches, who were responsible for the death of his wife and children. He and his remaining men, including Travis and McGurney, try to ride 100 miles to the safety of Fort Crane, a fictional analogue of Fort Craig in New Mexico territory. Along the way they attack an Indian band, despite being heavily outnumbered. Vinson's vengeance knows no bounds, until Travis is ultimately forced to take a stand and confront him.

Cast
 Joel McCrea as Sgt. Vinson 
 Forrest Tucker as Pvt. McGurney 
 Susan Cabot as Piute Girl 
 John Russell as Pvt. Robert W. Travis 
 George N. Neise as Pvt. Pendleton 
 Anthony Caruso as Pawnee (Indian scout) 
 Robert Osterloh as Pvt. Schwabacker 
 Denver Pyle as Pvt. Collins 
 Francis McDonald as Old Piute Man (as Francis J. McDonald) 
 Guy Prescott as Pvt. Tucker 
 Rayford Barnes as Pvt. Moss 
 Irving Bacon as Charlie the Trader 
 Claire Carleton as Adele (Charlie's wife) 
 Larry Chance as Moving Cloud

See also
 List of American films of 1959
 List of American films of 1958

References

External links 
 
 
 
 

1958 films
1958 Western (genre) films
American Western (genre) films
Western (genre) cavalry films
Apache Wars films
Films set in New Mexico
United Artists films
Films directed by Joseph M. Newman
Films produced by Walter Mirisch
1950s English-language films
1950s American films